East Worcestershire was a county constituency in the county of Worcestershire, represented in the House of Commons of the Parliament of the United Kingdom.

It was created by the Reform Act 1832 for the 1832 general election, and elected two Members of Parliament (MPs), by the bloc vote system. Under the Redistribution of Seats Act 1885, its representation was reduced to one MP for the 1885 general election, elected by the first past the post voting system. The constituency was abolished for the 1918 general election.

Boundaries
1832–1885: The Petty Sessional Divisions of Stourbridge, Dudley, Droitwich, Northfield, Blockley and Pershore, and the Borough of Evesham.

Members of Parliament

MPs 1832–1885

MPs 1885–1918

Elections

Elections in the 1830s

Elections in the 1840s

Barneby's death caused a by-election.

Elections in the 1850s

Rushout succeeded to the peerage, becoming 3rd Baron Northwick and causing a by-election.

Elections in the 1860s
Hodgetts-Foley's death caused a by-election.

Gough-Calthorpe succeeded to the peerage, becoming 5th Baron Calthorpe and causing a by-election.

Elections in the 1870s

 
 
 

 Laslett withdrew from the race in order to contest Worcester.

Elections in the 1880s

Elections in the 1890s
Hastings was expelled from the House of Commons, causing a by-election.

Elections in the 1900s

Elections in the 1910s

General Election 1914–15:

Another General Election was required to take place before the end of 1915. The political parties had been making preparations for an election to take place and by July 1914, the following candidates had been selected; 
Unionist: Leverton Harris
Liberal: Wilfrid Hill

References

Parliamentary constituencies in Worcestershire (historic)
Constituencies of the Parliament of the United Kingdom established in 1832
Constituencies of the Parliament of the United Kingdom disestablished in 1918